Military ranks of the Swedish Armed Forces shows the rank system used in the Swedish Armed Forces today, as well as changes during the 20th century due to changes in the personnel structure.

Current ranks 
1 October 2019 a new rank system was introduced in the Swedish Armed Forces. The rank insignia below are as worn on the field uniform. Army, navy and air force rank titles are shown below.

Rank insignia 
Officers

Others

Relative rank 

Seniority for officers with the same relative rank are determined according to time-in-grade.

Civilian employees follow the OF levels but are called CF instead (C stands for Civilian). It's the position that declares the CF level for civilian employees. The field uniform is the same as for officers with the exception that the bronze markings on the uniform is colored white (To mark that it's an Civilian).

Former ranks

Ranks 2009–2019 
Since 2009, there are three categories of ranks,  and 

 (Officers)
Officers lead units from platoon and up. Cadets with no prior service must complete a 6-9 months preparatory course before they start at the academy.

 (Senior NCOs, lit. Specialist Officers)
Experienced soldiers who have served as corporals and sergeants may take a shortened course. Civilians must complete a preparatory course before the 1.5 year specialist training starts.

 (junior NCOs, soldiers and seamen, lit. Squad leaders, soldiers and seamen)
They command squads of approx. 8 men. Ordinary soldiers are given the rank  with different insignia depending on how long they have served.

When the professional NCO corps was reintroduced in 2009 it was decided that some ranks in this category should, like the old  ranks in 1960–1972, have a relative rank higher than the most junior officers. The current relative ranks are shown in the table below.

Rank insignia
The table below shows ranks according to seniority, with the most senior to the left. OF denotes officers, OR other ranks (as per STANAG 2116). Those ranks were ratified by the supreme commander on October 24, 2008, and became effective as of January 1, 2009. Military ranks of (primarily) Great Britain have been used as a basis for harmonization with NATO.

Ranks 1983–2009 
A major change in the personnel structure in 1983 (NBO 1983), merged the three professional corps of platoon officers, company officers, and regimental officers into a one-track career system within a single corps called professional officers. The three messes were also merged to one.

Officers

Others

Ranks 1972–1983 
The three-track career system was maintained, as well as three separate messes.

Ranks 1957–1972 

Field uniform model 1958/1959 - rank structure of 1960

Uniform model 1939 - rank structure of 1949 
In 1949 the relative rank of the warrant officers were elevated further so that to the following effect:

The lowest warrant officer, had relative rank just below the lowest officer rank, .
The highest warrant officer rank, had relative rank between first lieutenant and captain.

Uniform model 1939

Uniform model 1923 
In a reform 1926 the relative rank of the then senior warrant officer, was increased to be equal with the junior officer rank  and above the most junior officer rank .

Uniform model 1910 
When an army based on national service (conscription) was introduced in 1901 all commissioned officers had ranks that were senior to the warrant officers and non-commissioned officers.

Notes

References 

 Research: Ph.D. thesis in "War and the career system", Dagens Nyheter by Professor Mats Alvesson, researcher of military organization at Lunds University, and Karl Ydén at the University of Göteborg.

External links 
 Military Ranks of Kingdom of Sweden

Sweden
Military ranks of Sweden